The West Asian Football Federation (WAFF), founded in 2001, is a regional sub-confederation of football, goverened under the Asian Football Confederation, for nations in Western Asia. The WAFF consists of 12 member associations.
 	
WAFF organizes the WAFF Championship. Some nations from outside the region are occasionally invited to participate in the competition, such as Kazakhstan and Kyrgyzstan in 2000 and Thailand in 2023. The Secretary General is the Khalil Al Salem from Jordan.

History 
The founding members of the West Asian Football Federation are Iran, Iraq, Jordan, Lebanon, Palestine and Syria. In 2009, three more associations joined the federation: Qatar, United Arab Emirates and Yemen. Four other nations of Western Asia: Bahrain, Kuwait, Oman and Saudi Arabia joined in 2010. Iran left the federation on 10 June 2014, with the creation of the Central Asian Football Federation.

Member associations

Current title holders

Rankings

National football team
WAFF Men's National Football Team Ranking by FIFAUpdate: 23 June 2022

Leading Men's team:

Women's national football team

WAFF Women's National Football Team Ranking by FIFAUpdate: 13 October 2022

Leading Women's team:

National futsal team
WAFF Men's National Futsal Team Ranking by Futsal World RankingUpdate: June 2022

Note: (*) Inactive

Women's national futsal team
WAFF Women's National Futsal Team Ranking by The Roon BaUpdate: December 2022

Note: (*) Inactive

National beach soccer team
AFF Men's National Beach Soccer Team Ranking by BSWWUpdate: December 2021

Controversy
On 29 January 2015, after the defeat of Iraq and the United Arab Emirates during the 2015 AFC Asian Cup, West Asian Football Federation members reportedly sought to remove Australia from the AFC primarily due to "Australia benefiting hugely from Asian involvement without giving much in return".

References

External links 
  
  

West Asian Football Federation